José Carlos de Jésus Júnior or simply Júnior (born 10 October 1977) is a Brazilian former  professional footballer who played as a midfielder. He spent three seasons in the Bundesliga with 1. FC Kaiserslautern and 1. FC Nürnberg.

References

External links
 

Living people
1977 births
Association football midfielders
Brazilian footballers
1. FC Kaiserslautern players
1. FC Kaiserslautern II players
1. FC Nürnberg players
SV Wacker Burghausen players
FC Kärnten players
Bundesliga players
2. Bundesliga players
Brazilian expatriate footballers
Brazilian expatriate sportspeople in Belgium
Expatriate footballers in Belgium
Brazilian expatriate sportspeople in Germany
Expatriate footballers in Germany
Brazilian expatriate sportspeople in Austria
Expatriate footballers in Austria